Francesco Traina (1578–1651) was a Catholic prelate who served as Bishop of Agrigento (1627–1651).

He was born in Palermo, Italy in 1578.
On 2 March 1627, he was appointed during the papacy of Pope Urban VIII as Bishop of Agrigento.
On 14 March 1627, he was consecrated bishop by Cosimo de Torres, Bishop of Perugia. 
He served as Bishop of Agrigento until his death in October 1651.

References

External links and additional sources
 (for Chronology of Bishops)
 (for Chronology of Bishops) 

17th-century Roman Catholic bishops in Sicily
Bishops appointed by Pope Urban VIII
1578 births
1651 deaths